Bala Khaf Rural District is a rural district (dehestan) in Salami District, Khaf County, Razavi Khorasan Province, Iran. At the 2006 census, its population was 16,278, in 3,619 families.  The rural district has 17 villages.

References 

Rural Districts of Razavi Khorasan Province
Khaf County